Samantha Browne (born 3 July 1989) is a Barbadian netball player who represents Barbados internationally and plays in the positions of wing attack, centre and wing defense. She competed at the Netball World Cup on four occasions in 2007, 2011, 2015 and 2019. She also represented Barbados at the Commonwealth Games in 2014, which also marked her maiden Commonwealth Games appearance.

References 

1989 births
Living people
Barbadian netball players
Netball players at the 2014 Commonwealth Games
Commonwealth Games competitors for Barbados
2019 Netball World Cup players